The monument dedicated to the "Luhansk victims of the OUN-UPA" is a statue located in Luhansk, Ukraine. The monument was unveiled in 2010 under the direction of city deputy Arsen Klinchaev and in association with the Party of Regions in a park in the center of Luhansk. The monument is adjacent to the Soviet memorial to the World War II underground resistance group, The Young Guard. A Ukrainian nationalist group described the monument as provocative and a distortion of history.

Monument description 
The monument consists of a figure tied up mother whose eyes are closed and his hands pulling the child and protecting their man whose hands are tied with rope. The inscription on the arch above the monument reads: “In memory of the victims of fascism and nationalism,” whereas beneath is a slab engraved with a dozen names belonging to those killed. The monument also has inscribed the phrase "The truth should not be forgotten". The alleged victims alluded to in the monument's dedication are not explicitly referenced.

History
The monument was unveiled "To People Of Luhansk Who Perished From Hands Of Nationalist Chasteners From OUN-UPA". The initiative for the monument came from city deputy Arsen Klinchaev, founder of the “Museum of the Victims of Orange Revolution”.  According to this local politician, a memorial is necessary so that everybody learns about the alleged crimes of the OUN and UPA, who he claims "acted in a more bestial manner than the fascists.” When a provisional memorial was unveiled, a placard was attached to the stone displaying a dove pierced by a sword with a swastika. Klinchaev stated the following as the memorial's function:

At the unveiling of a similar monument in Svatove, Luhansk Oblast in 2008, the vice-Mayor of Luhansk, Yevhen Kharin stated,

The monument was finally opened on May 9, 2010.

See also 

 The shot in the back (monument)
 Stepan Bandera monument in Lviv

References 

World War II memorials in Ukraine
Buildings and structures in Luhansk
Tourist attractions in Luhansk Oblast
Ukrainian Insurgent Army